İkinci Cabanı (known as Nikolayevka and Dzerjinovka until 1999) is a village and municipality in the Shamakhi Rayon of Azerbaijan. It has a population of 834.  The municipality consists of the villages of İkinci Cabanı and Cabanı.

References

Populated places in Shamakhi District